Carnon may refer to:

 Carnon, or Carnon-Plage, a seaside resort in southern France, on the territory of the commune of Mauguio
 Carnon Downs, a village in Cornwall, United Kingdom
 Carnon River, a river in Cornwall, United Kingdom
 Carnon viaduct, in west Cornwall, United Kingdom